is a Japanese sport shooter. Yamashita represented Japan at the 2008 Summer Olympics in Beijing, where he competed for all three rifle shooting events.

In his first event, 10 m air rifle, Yamashita was able to hit a total of 590 points within six attempts, finishing twenty-eighth in the qualifying rounds. Few days later, he placed eighteenth in the 50 m rifle prone, by one target behind Belarus' Petr Litvinchuk from the final attempt, with a total score of 593 points. In his third and last event, 50 m rifle 3 positions, Yamashita was able to shoot 399 targets in a prone position, 382 in standing, and 386 in kneeling, for a total score of 1,167 points, finishing only in sixteenth place.

References

External links
NBC 2008 Olympics profile

Japanese male sport shooters
Living people
Olympic shooters of Japan
Shooters at the 2008 Summer Olympics
Shooters at the 2016 Summer Olympics
People from Tokushima Prefecture
1977 births
Asian Games medalists in shooting
Shooters at the 2002 Asian Games
Shooters at the 2006 Asian Games
Shooters at the 2010 Asian Games
Shooters at the 2014 Asian Games
Asian Games bronze medalists for Japan
Medalists at the 2014 Asian Games
Shooters at the 2018 Asian Games
21st-century Japanese people